James Chisholm (died c. 1545) was a Scottish Roman Catholic clergyman who was Bishop of Dunblane from 1487 to 1526.

James Chisholm may also refer to:
 James Chisholm (merchant) (1772–1837), an early settler in colonial Australia who served in the New South Wales Corps and was a founder of the Bank of New South Wales
 James Chisholm (politician) (1806–1888), son of the above, a pastoralist who was a member of the New South Wales Legislative Council from 1851 to 1856 and 1865–1888
 James Chisholm (priest) (1815–1855), an American Episcopal priest in Portsmouth, Virginia, who died of yellow fever
 James Chisholm, co-founder of The Troth, an American-based international heathen organization
 James Chisholm (rugby union) (born 1995), English rugby union player

See also 
 Jimmy Chisholm (born 1956), Scottish actor who played Jimmy Blair in Take the High Road
 James Chisholm King (1886–1970), Canadian dentist and political figure in Saskatchewan, represented Humboldt from 1935 to 1938 in the Legislative Assembly of Saskatchewan
 James Chisholm Dillon (1880–1949), Australian politician, member of the Victorian Legislative Assembly for Essendon from 1932 to 1943